The 1955 Paris–Roubaix was the 53rd edition of the Paris–Roubaix, a classic one-day cycle race in France. The single day event was held on 10 April 1955 and stretched  from Paris to the finish at Roubaix Velodrome. The winner was Jean Forestier from France.

Results

References

1955
1955 in road cycling
1955 in French sport
1955 Challenge Desgrange-Colombo
April 1955 sports events in Europe